Sherkat-e Sakhtemani-ye Atminan (also Romanized as Sherkat-e Sākhtemānī-ye Āṭmīnān) is a village in Howmeh Rural District, in the Central District of Andimeshk County, Khuzestan Province, Iran. At the 2006 census, its population was 21, in 6 families.

References 

Populated places in Andimeshk County